Western Ballads is the first full-length album by Jackson United, released in 2004.

Track listing
 "Lions Roar"
 "All The Way"
 "A Better Life"
 "Down To You"
 "She’s Giving In"
 "Unchanged"
 "Fell Into"
 "Loose Ends"
 "OK Alright"
 "Here Come Hollow"
 "Pure"
 "Long Shadow"
 "Sharp Edges"
 "That Curse"
 "Don't Point Your Guns At Me" (Bonus Track)
 "Back To Me" (Bonus Track)
 "Let Us In Dear" (Bonus Track)

References

Jackson United albums
2004 albums